Alberto Estrella (born Alberto Rodríguez Estrella, 23 September 1962) is a Mexican actor. He has appeared in more than 90 films and television shows since 1986.

Biography
Estrella was born in Guadalajara, Jalisco, Mexico. He starred in the film The Queen of the Night, which was entered into the 1994 Cannes Film Festival. His famous telenovela role was that of Marcial Andrade in Between Love and Hatred. He is also known for playing Emiliano Zapata in the film Santos Peregrinos.

His brother is Ricardo Rodríguez Estrella.

Filmography

References

External links

1962 births
Living people
Mexican male film actors
Mexican male television actors
Male actors from Mexico City
20th-century Mexican male actors
21st-century Mexican male actors